Anders Halland Johannessen (born 23 August 1999) is a Norwegian road cyclist, who currently rides for UCI ProTeam . 

Along with his twin brother Tobias, Anders has raced in mountain biking, cyclo-cross and road cycling, before deciding to focus primarily on road racing.

Major results

Road
2020
 2nd Road race, National Under–23 Road Championships
 10th Gylne Gutuer
2021
 7th Overall Tour de l'Avenir
1st Stage 6
 8th Overall Giro Ciclistico d'Italia
 9th Overall Tour of Turkey
 10th Overall Alpes Isère Tour
2022
 6th Overall Tour of Turkey

Cyclo-cross
2018–2019
 2nd National Championships

References

External links

1999 births
Living people
Norwegian male cyclists
Twin sportspeople
Norwegian twins
People from Frogn